Reverend Zen is a New York rock/blues/jazz group that debuted in 2006 with their album, Angels, Blues & the Crying Moon, released by Blakjak Music Records / Anamosa Songs ASCAP c2006. In 2015 the band released their ten-song video collection entitled Reverend Zen The Videos in association with Blakjak Music Records / Anamosa Songs ASCAP c2015. In 2019 the band released their single "Magdalena - New Wings" on Blakjak Music Records / Anamosa Songs ASCAP c2019.

The band was formed by Jack Evans, who is also the group's lead singer and drummer.

Recognition

The album and the band have won seventy five worldwide music industry awards:
2017 Winner Jango Radio / Radio Airplay Summer Song Contest - NYC
2016 Semi Finalist Australia Song Contest - Sydney
2016 Runner Up Song of the Year Contest - Houston
2015 Finalist Great American Song Contest - Portland
2015 Semi Finalist UK Song Contest - London
 2011/12 ASCAP Plus Award -NYC
 2010/11 ASCAP Plus Award - NYC 
 2010 Semi Finalist UK Song Contest - London  
 2009/10 Song of the Year Nomination with 9 Finalist Awards from ABC Radio Networks Fame Games Effigy Awards - Spain
 2009/10 ASCAP Plus Award - NYC
 2009 Semi Finalist UK Song Contest -London 
 2009 Semi Finalist Australia Song Contest - Sydney
 2008/09 Artist of the Year Nomination and 7 Finalist Awards from ABC Radio Networks Fame Games Effigy Awards - Spain 
 2008/09 ASCAP Plus Award - NYC  
 2008 Best Song Nomination Los Angeles Music Awards - Los Angeles
 2008 Best Song Nomination Toronto Exclusive Magazine Awards - Toronto
 2008 Finalist with 2 Semi Finalist Awards France's 100% Song Contest - Paris
 2008 Semi Finalist UK Song Contest - London
 2008 Semi Finalist Australia Song Contest - Sydney
 2008 Golden Wave Artist of the Year Award  - The Colorado Wave - Indie Music Wave shows I Radio LA - Denver
 2007/08 Song of the Year and Artist of the Year Nomination with 5 Finalist Awards ABC Radio Networks Fame Games Effigy Awards - Spain
2007/08 2 Finalist Awards Unisong International Song Contest - Los Angeles
 2007/08 ASCAP Plus Award NYC
 2007 Artist of the Year with 4 Best Song Nominations Los Angeles Music Awards - Los Angeles
 2007 Artist of the Year WCH Radio - St. Louis
2006/07 2 Finalist Awards Unisong International Song Contest - Los Angeles
 2006 Bronze Artist Award RGW Radio - Norfolk, UK
 2006 Finalist with 5 Runner Up Awards VH1 Song of the Year Contest - Houston/ NYC 
 Additional, multiple awards in the Billboard World Song Contest - NYC, the Mid Atlantic Song Contest - Washington, DC and the UK Singer/Songwriter Awards - London.

The album was co-written by Evans and James Gerard.

Angels, Blues & the Crying Moon Track listing
 "Magdalena" (4:41)
 "Bad Attitude" (4:35)
 "Don't Try to Tell Me" (4:18)
 "The Boston Shakedown" (4:09)
 "Only a Fool" (4:46)
 "My Sigmund Freud" (4:42)
 "Her Love" (5:12)
 "Dangerous Times" (3:12)
 "Boy Genius' (4:46)
 "The One in Love" (4:52)

Compilations 
Reverend Zen appeared on compilation albums:
 Fresh Produce 4 (2007) MVY Radio - Martha's Vineyard, Nantucket, Cape Cod, Newport, RI
 Music For Coffee Beings (2007) RPW Records - Vancouver, Canada
 Songwriters & Storytellers 2007 Indie Artist Alliance - San Francisco
 Just Talents (2007) Research Music - Miami, Rio de Janeiro, Berlin

References

External links
 

Rock music groups from New York (state)
People from Katonah, New York
Musical groups established in 2006
2006 establishments in New York (state)